Samartsevo is a rural locality (a village) in Otradinsky Selsoviet, Kuyurgazinsky District, Bashkortostan, Russia. The population was 1 as of 2010. There are 5 streets.

Geography 
Samartsevo is located 28 km southeast of Yermolayevo (the district's administrative centre) by road. Yamangulovo is the nearest rural locality.

References 

Rural localities in Kuyurgazinsky District